Bobby Jones (born January 9, 1962) is an American former college basketball coach. He was the men's head coach at Saint Francis University. Jones resigned after the 2008 season, his ninth with the school.

After being named high school Player of the Year in Georgia, Jones joined Western Kentucky in 1980, playing there through the 1983–84 season; as of 2009, he ranks third all-time for the university in assists. Prior to his hiring at St. Francis, he was an assistant or associate coach from 1991 to 1999 at four schools: Middle Tennessee State, Western Kentucky, Pittsburgh, and Minnesota. St. Francis had an 85–167 record while Jones was the head coach.

After leaving St. Francis, Jones worked as a scout. He was later the athletic director of the Trinity Area School District in Washington, Pennsylvania, from 2010 through 2017.

References

1962 births
Living people
American men's basketball coaches
American men's basketball players
Athletic directors
Basketball coaches from Georgia (U.S. state)
Basketball players from Georgia (U.S. state)
High school basketball coaches in the United States
Middle Tennessee Blue Raiders men's basketball coaches
Minnesota Golden Gophers men's basketball coaches
Pittsburgh Panthers men's basketball coaches
Saint Francis Red Flash men's basketball coaches
Sportspeople from Macon, Georgia
Western Kentucky Hilltoppers basketball coaches
Western Kentucky Hilltoppers basketball players
Guards (basketball)